Meurig ab Ithel or Idwal was an 8th-century king of part of Glywysing in southern Wales.

Meurig's father Ithel ap Morgan had been in sole possession of both Gwent and Glywysing (i.e., Morgannwg), but at his death divided his realm among his four sons. Rhodri, Rhys, and Meurig apparently received parts of Glywysing and Ffernfail received Gwent.

Lloyd notes that Glywysing at this time is "involved in much obscurity". It was eventually united by the line of Meurig's brother Rhys in the time of King Hywel or his sons.

References

Welsh royalty
8th-century Welsh monarchs